Ray Garton (born December 2, 1962 in Redding, California) is an American author, well known for his work in horror fiction. He has written over sixty books, and, in 2006, he was presented with the World Horror Convention Grand Master Award.

Personal life
Garton lives in Northern California with his wife Dawn.

Works

Novels
Seductions (1984)
Darklings (1985)
Crucifax Autumn (1988) (variant title of expurgated edition: Crucifax (1989))
Lot Lizards (1990)
Trade Secrets (1990)
Kill the Teacher’s Pet (1991) as Joseph Locke
New Neighbor (1991)
Dark Channel (1992)
Kiss of Death (1992) as Joseph Locke
Petrified (1992) as Joseph Locke
Game Over (1993) as Joseph Locke
The Teacher (1993) as Joseph Locke
1-900-Killer (1994) as Joseph Locke
Vengeance (1994) as Joseph Locke
Biofire (1996)
Shackled (1996)
411, a novella (1998)
Sex and Violence in Hollywood (2001)
Zombie Love (2003)
Scissors (2004)
The Loveliest Dead (2005)
Serpent Girl (2008)
The Arthur Darknell Double (2008, Lonely Road Books) as Arthur Darknell (features two original novels attached back to back in the style of the old Ace Doubles: Loveless and Murder was my Alibi)
The Most Interesting Prospect (2008, Lonely Road Books) as Arthur Darknell (26 copy limited edition chapbook of a unique short story that came with the Lettered Edition of The Arthur Darknell Double)
Death Hunt on Ervoon (formerly known as Vespix) (Cemetery Dance Publications, 2010)

Series

Blood and Lace series
Writing as Joseph Locke
Vampire Heart (1994)
Deadly Relations (1994)

The Folks series
The Folks (2001)
The Folks 2 (2008)

Live Girls vampire series
Live Girls (1987)
Night Life (2005)

Werewolf series
Ravenous (2008)
Bestial (2009)

Movie novelizations
Invaders from Mars (1986)
A Nightmare on Elm Street 4: The Dream Master (1989) as Joseph Locke
A Nightmare on Elm Street 5: The Dream Child (1989) as Joseph Locke
Warlock (1989)
Good Burger (1997) as Joseph Locke
Can't Hardly Wait (1998)

TV series tie-in contributions
TV series tie-in novels:

The Secret World of Alex Mack
Featuring characters from The Secret World of Alex Mack TV-series:
Hocus Pocus (1997) as Joseph Locke
Lights, Camera, Action! (1998)

Sabrina, the Teenage Witch
All featuring characters from the Sabrina, the Teenage Witch TV-series:
Ben There, Done That (1997) as Joseph Locke 
The Troll Bride (1998) as Joseph Locke
All That Glitters (1998)

Buffy the Vampire Slayer
Featuring characters from the Buffy the Vampire Slayer TV-series: 
Resurrecting Ravana (1999)

Collections
Methods of Madness (1990)
Pieces of Hate (1995)
The Girl in the Basement and Other Stories (2004)
'Nids and Other Stories (2005)
Slivers of Bone (2008)

Short stories
"Active Member" (1987)
"Monsters" (1988)
"Sinema" (1988)
"Punishments" (1989)
"Dr Krusadian's Method" (1990)
"Fat" (1990)
"The Other Man" (1990)
"The Picture of Health" (1990)
"Shock Radio" (1990)
"Something Kinky" (1990)
"Pieces" (1992)
"Screams at the Gateway to Fame" (1996)
"Hair of the Dog" (1997)
"Haunted in the Head" (1997)
"From Eight to Nine O' Clock" (2007)

Non-fiction
In a Dark Place: The Story of a True Haunting (1992) Co-authored with Ed Warren, Lorraine Warren, Al Snedeker, and Carmen Snedeker.

In a Dark Place is based on the events of the Snedeker family's alleged encounter with the paranormal. Garton dislikes this book and is glad it is out of print, saying: "The family involved, which was going through some serious problems like alcoholism and drug addiction, could not keep their story straight, and I became very frustrated; it's hard writing a non-fiction book when all the people involved are telling you different stories." 

Garton appeared on MonsterTalk episode "A Connecticut Haunting in a Keen Author's Court" released in August 2011 discussing the book/haunting, calling the book "the low point of [his] career".

Reception
Reception to Garton's work has been largely positive, with his books receiving positive reviews from Dread Central and Rocky Mountain News.

See also

List of horror fiction authors

References

External links
 Official website
 Interview with Author Ray Garton
 The KBIM Paranormal Talk Radio Pat & Brian Show. Beyond Investigation Magazine. July 15, 2009. Ray Garton and Carmen Reed (Snedeker) interviewed on The Pat & Brian Show about the origins of the book In a Dark Place, the story behind it, the continued debate between Garton and Snedeker regarding the fiction/non-fiction of the claimed experiences by the Snedekers.
 

1962 births
20th-century American novelists
21st-century American novelists
American atheists
American horror novelists
American male novelists
American skeptics
Living people
People from Redding, California
20th-century American male writers
21st-century American male writers
Novelists from California